The Meritan Midnight Classic is an annual non-competitive bike ride billed as suitable for the whole family held in Memphis, Tennessee. The  ride begins at midnight and travels through Midtown Memphis, East Memphis, Midtown and Central Gardens. Currently in its 16th year, the race is the largest cycling tour in the Memphis area. More than 1,500 people attended the 2015 tour. The event charges preregistration fees ranging from $25–$55, which includes a t-shirt and snacks after the ride. (which most finished around 2am). The fastest time is 59 minutes and 51 seconds.  The 2017 Ride is set for August 26, 2017.  People interested in this event can go here to learn more about it and register to ride.

The event is preceded by the Moonlight Tailgate, which begins at 10 p.m. and runs throughout the bike tour. The festival includes food provided by vendors, music by local artists, and booths from various bike shops in Memphis. Proceeds from both the Moonlight Tailgate and the bike tour itself benefit Meritan, a Memphis-based non-profit providing health, social and child placement services.

Participants in the tour are allowed to ride in the road, and both Memphis police and Midnight Classic volunteers act to divert traffic, providing cyclists with empty roads and clear paths for the entire 17 mile ride. There are also several "rest stops" along the ride, along with gas stations with food and drinks available.

Recognition is also awarded to the "largest organized group of people" at the event, along with a "Bling Yourself" and "Bling your Bike" Contest. The 2016 ride also features a custom jersey.

References

External links

Culture of Memphis, Tennessee
Cycling in Tennessee
Events in Memphis, Tennessee
Events in Tennessee